The House of Chodkiewicz was one of the most influential noble families of Lithuanian-Ruthenian descent within the Polish–Lithuanian Commonwealth in the 16th and 17th century.

History 
Chodko Jurewicz, chamberlain to Grand Duke Vytenis, was probably the ancestor of the whole clan and gave it the name Chodkiewicz, meaning "son of Chodzko". Surnames were not used in that time, but apparently later in history, the name Chodzko became a surname after Christianization of Chodzko Juriewicz, father of Iwan (later Jan) Chodkiewicz. They bore the Chodkiewicz coat of arms. In 1572, Jan Hieronimowicz Chodkiewicz converted from Calvinism to Roman Catholicism with his two sons, which made them the first Polonized generation of the once Lithuanian-Ruthenian family. Emperor Charles V granted them the title of Imperial Count.

Notable family members
Chodko Jurewicz (c.1431–1447), founder of Chodkiewicz clan
Ivan Chodkiewicz (?–1484), founder of the Chodkiewicz family
Aleksander Chodkiewicz (1475–1549), voivode of the Nowogródek Voivodeship, Grand Marshal of Lithuania
Yurii Chodkiewicz (1524–1569), voivode of the Nowogródek Voivodeship
Hieronim Chodkiewicz (1500–1561), Grand Lithuanian Podczaszy, Elder of Samogitia, Count of the Roman Empire
Ivan Hieronimowicz Chodkiewicz (1537–1579), Livonian hetman, Grand Lithuanian Marshall, castellan of Vilnius.
Grzegorz Chodkiewicz (?–1572), Grand Hetman of Lithuania
Jan Karol Chodkiewicz (1560–1621), Grand Hetman of Lithuania
Krzysztof Chodkiewicz (?–1652), castellan of Vilnius, voivode of Vilnius Voivodship
Jan Kazimierz Chodkiewicz (1616–1660), castellan of Vilnius
Anna Eufrozyna Chodkiewicz (c. 1600 – c. 1631), married Prokop Sieniawski in 1623
Teresa Chodkiewicz (1645–1672), married Stanisław Bonifacy Krasiński about 1667
Jan Mikołaj Chodkiewicz (1738–1781), father of Rozalia Lubomirska
Aleksander Chodkiewicz (1776-1838), Polish patriot and polymath

See also 
 Lithuanian nobility
 List of szlachta

External links 
  Genealogy of Chodkiewicz family.
  Site about Chodkiewicz clan.
  Full interactive family tree (in Polish).

References 

 Kasper Niesiecki, Herbarz polski Kaspra Niesieckiego, Published by Waif, 1839, Google Print, p.48 (public domain)